Astro is the first album of long duration (after the EP Le disc of Astrou) of Chilean indie band Astro, released in 2011. The first single from the album was "Ciervos" and followed "Colombo", "Panda" and "Manglares".

This album was chosen by National Public Radio among the 50 discs of 2012.

Track listing 
All tracks written by Andrés Nusser, except where noted.
 Ciervos (Deer)
 Coco (Coconut)
 Colombo
 Druida de las nubes (Druid of the clouds)
 Panda
 Miu-Miu
 Manglares (Mangroves)
 Mira, está nevando en las pirámides (Look, it's snowing in the pyramids)
 Volteretas (Tumbles)
 Pepa
 Nueces de Bangladesh (Nuts of Bangladesh)
 Miu-Miu reaparece (Miu-Miu reappears)

Personnel 
Astro
Andrés Nusser – vocals, guitar
Octavio Caviares – drums
Lego Moustache – keyboards, percussion
Zeta Moustache – keyboards, bass

Production
Andrés Nusser – producer, recording and mixing
Chalo González – mixing and mastering
Cristóbal Carvajal – recording
Ignacio Soto – recording

References 

2011 debut albums
Astro (Chilean band) albums